Julio Peña (18 June 1912 - 27 July 1972) was a Spanish actor. He appeared in more than one hundred films from 1930 to 1972. He died on July 27, 1972 aged 60 at Cortijo Blanco in Marbella, where he was resting after appearing in the film Horror Express.

Filmography

References

External links 
 
 

1912 births
1972 deaths
Spanish male film actors